Group 4 of the 1954 FIFA World Cup took place from 17 to 23 June 1954. The group consisted of Belgium, England, Italy, and Switzerland.

Standings

Matches
All times listed are local time (CET, UTC+1).

Switzerland vs Italy

England vs Belgium

England looked set for victory when they led 3-1 early in the second half. But defensive lapses handed their opponents two simple goals, which took the game into extra time. Nat Lofthouse then edged England back in front before an unlucky headed own goal by Jimmy Dickinson handed the Belgians a draw.

Italy vs Belgium

England vs Switzerland

Play-off: Switzerland vs Italy

References

External links
 1954 FIFA World Cup archive

1954 FIFA World Cup
England at the 1954 FIFA World Cup
Italy at the 1954 FIFA World Cup
Switzerland at the 1954 FIFA World Cup
Belgium at the 1954 FIFA World Cup